The 18-55mm 3.5-5.6G AF-S Zoom-Nikkor lens is a midrange zoom lens manufactured by Nikon for use on Nikon DX format digital SLR cameras. Often included as a kit lens on entry-level DSLRs, it also can be purchased separately from the camera body.  Nikon first introduced the lens in 2005 and has provided three subsequent updates.  Following are the four variants as of 2014:

 AF-S DX Nikkor 18-55mm 3.5-5.6G ED, released in 2005
 AF-S DX Nikkor 18-55mm 3.5-5.6G ED II, released in 2006.  
AF-S DX Nikkor 18-55mm 3.5-5.6G VR, released in 2007.  
AF-S DX Nikkor 18-55mm 3.5-5.6G VR II, released in 2014.

Note:
VR means Vibration Reduction as used in Nikon Lenses.
IS means Image Stabilization as used in Canon Lenses.
VR (Nikon) and IS (Canon) are both the same thing, but each maker uses their own acronyms.

Like all lenses in the DX format, the 18-55mm casts a smaller image circle than lenses for full-frame 35mm cameras and is therefore only compatible with cameras having APS-C-sized sensors (or vignetting will happen). However, from 24mm onward until 55mm, the image circle will cover the full 35mm frame, and is usable on film.

Features
 Silent wave motor (AF-S)
 Extra-low Dispersion (ED) glass element, to reduce chromatic aberration (not available on either VR version)
 Easy variant of Vibration Reduction (most recent versions only), to make lens cheaper there is no "Active" and "Normal" VR options switch here

Construction
 Plastic body and mount
 52mm filter thread for widely used 52mm filters
 No protector from dust and moisture near mount
 Rotating front lens while focusing (not in VR II version)
 VR II version has a collapsible lens barrel, a design first used with certain lenses for Nikon's 1 mount for mirrorless interchangeable-lens cameras
(Lens construction details vary between models; see table below for specifications).

Performance
Thom Hogan praised its value and optical performance, but criticized its handling, noting a diminutive focus ring that rotates during focusing, with no manual override.

Specifications

See also
List of Nikon F-mount lenses with integrated autofocus motor
Nikon F-mount

References 

Camera lenses introduced in 2005
Nikon F-mount lenses